The diamond knot (or knife lanyard knot) is a knot for forming a decorative loop on the end of a cord such as on a lanyard.  A similar knot, also called the diamond knot, is a multistrand stopper knot, that is similar in appearance (although the footrope knot is really more similar, but it is simply an upside down diamond knot).  To avoid confusion, it is advisable to call this knot the knife lanyard knot. This knot is a four strand diamond knot implemented in two strands. The knife lanyard knot is "tied alike" the Chinese button knot, "but they are worked differently."

Tying
The diamond knot begins as a Carrick bend with the ends exiting diagonally opposite each other.  When the steps below are completed the knot is rearranged and tightened so that the ends emerge from the knot parallel and opposite their own standing part.  A Chinese button knot is often tied in a very similar manner, but without leaving a loop at the end.

See also
List of knots
Friendship knot
MV Diamond Knot

References

Decorative knots